Nicolas Tournat  (born 5 April 1994) is a French handball player for Industria Kielce and the French national team.

He was part of the French team that won the bronze medal at the 2018 European Men's Handball Championship.

References

External links

1994 births
Living people
French male handball players
People from Niort
Sportspeople from Deux-Sèvres
Handball players at the 2020 Summer Olympics
Medalists at the 2020 Summer Olympics
Olympic gold medalists for France
Olympic medalists in handball
Vive Kielce players